Nicolás Arredondo may refer to:

 Nicolás Antonio de Arredondo (1726–1802), Spanish soldier and politician
 Nicolás Arredondo (boxer) (1950–1987), Mexican boxer